Steely Hollow is an unincorporated area and census-designated place (CDP) in Cherokee County, Oklahoma, United States. The population was 206 at the 2010 census.

Geography
The name "Steely Hollow" refers to a valley on the east side of the CDP, leading southeast to the Illinois River. Residences in the CDP are both within the valley of Steely Hollow and on high ground to the west of the valley.

Demographics

References

Census-designated places in Cherokee County, Oklahoma
Census-designated places in Oklahoma